Someone to Watch Over Me may refer to:

 "Someone to Watch Over Me" (song), a 1926 song written by George and Ira Gershwin
 Someone to Watch Over Me (album), a 2011 album by Susan Boyle
 Someone to Watch Over Me (film), a 1987 film starring Tom Berenger and Mimi Rogers
 Someone to Watch Over Me (TV series), a 2016 Philippine television series
 "Someone to Watch Over Me", a 1991 episode of the radio series Adventures in Odyssey

Television episodes
 "Someone to Watch Over Me" (Ballykissangel)
 "Someone to Watch Over Me" (Battlestar Galactica)
 "Someone to Watch Over Me" (Born and Bred)
 "Someone to Watch Over Me" (Crossing Jordan)
 "Someone to Watch Over Me" (Frasier)
 "Someone to Watch Over Me" (Goodnight Sweetheart)
 "Someone to Watch Over Me" (Holby City)
 "Someone to Watch Over Me" (Jake and the Fatman)
 "Someone to Watch Over Me" (Nightingales)
 "Someone to Watch Over Me" (Pretty Little Liars)
 "Someone to Watch Over Me" (Star Trek: Voyager)
 "Someone to Watch Over Me" (Step by Step)

See also
 Someone Who'll Watch Over Me, a 1992 play by Frank McGuinness
 Someone to Witch Over Me, an episode of Charmed